Patimat Serajutdin Abakarova (born 23 October 1994) is a Dagestani-born Azerbaijani taekwondo athlete. She has been playing for the Azerbaijan national team since 2013.  Patimat Abakarova won a bronze medal at the XXXI Summer Olympic Games held in Rio de Janeiro in 2016.  Patimat Abakarova at the European Championships;  She was awarded a silver medal in 2016.  Abakarova also won bronze medals at the 3rd Islamic Solidarity Games in 2013 and the 1st European Games in 2015.

She competed at the 2016 Summer Olympics in Rio de Janeiro, in the women's 49 kg and won bronze medal.

Biography 
Patimat Abakarova was born on October 23, 1994 in Makhachkala.  At the age of 9, she went to the karate section, and three months later she moved with her family and could not attend training.  Nevertheless, near the new place of residence - in the 38th school of Makhachkala - taekwondo classes were held by coach Ismail Ismailov, under whose supervision Abakarova began to practice taekwondo.  Soon the team moved to the new Martial Arts Center, which Abakarova still attends.
In 2013, the Azerbaijan Taekwondo Federation offered Abakarova to perform at the domestic championship of Azerbaijan, in which Abakarova took first place.  Soon Patimat was invited to the training camp.  She was looked at by the coaching staff of the national team, by the decision of which Abakarova was offered to compete for Azerbaijan.
In June 2015, she took part in the first European Games in Baku, where she took third place. On June 29, President of Azerbaijan Ilham Aliyev signed orders to award the winners of the first European Games and persons who made a great contribution to the development of sports in Azerbaijan.  Patimat Abakarova was awarded the Progress medal for her great achievements at the first European Games and her contribution to the development of sports in Azerbaijan.
In 2016, at the European Olympic Qualification Tournament, held in Istanbul, she took first place, having received a ticket to the Olympic Games in Rio de Janeiro.  In the same year, she became the silver medalist of the European Championship, held in Montreux, Switzerland, losing in the final to Tatyana Kudashova from Russia. She won a bronze medal at the 2016 Summer Olympics.

See also 
 Muslim women in sport

References

External links

1994 births
Living people
Azerbaijani female taekwondo practitioners
Olympic taekwondo practitioners of Azerbaijan
Taekwondo practitioners at the 2016 Summer Olympics
Medalists at the 2016 Summer Olympics
Olympic bronze medalists for Azerbaijan
Olympic medalists in taekwondo
Naturalized citizens of Azerbaijan
Taekwondo practitioners at the 2015 European Games
European Games medalists in taekwondo
European Games bronze medalists for Azerbaijan
Medalists at the 2019 Summer Universiade
European Taekwondo Championships medalists
Universiade medalists in taekwondo
Universiade bronze medalists for Azerbaijan
Islamic Solidarity Games medalists in taekwondo
Islamic Solidarity Games competitors for Azerbaijan